Sunil Edmund Hettiarachchi (8 April 1937 – 3 December 2015) was a well-known Sri Lankan comedian and character actor known for his bald appearance with a full beard and skinny frame.

Career
Hettiarachchi began his film career in 1982 playing a servant in Kadawunu Poronduwa. He began to gain fame with his comic roles in low budget genre films in the late-80s and 90s which emphasized his comical look.

Despite primarily playing comedic roles, Hettiarachchi has appeared in several art films in small character roles. In 1987, he played a small role in Tissa Abeysekera's Viragaya. In 1992, he had a role in Kulageya. In 1994, he played a comic character in Mee Haraka. He also has had roles in Me Mage Sandai (2001).

He has also acted in International productions filmed in Sri Lanka like The Second Jungle Book: Mowgli & Baloo (1997) and Mother Teresa: In the Name of God's Poor (both 1997).

Notable teledramas

 Alli and Galli 
 Bodima
 Charitha Dekak
 Dedunu Yanaya
 Giju
 Giraya
 Hiru Thanivela
 Hotel D'Kalabala
 Kasee Salu 
 Keetaya 1, 2, 3, 4
 Kethumathi
 Kopi Kade
 Lahiru Dahasak
 Mahagedara
 Mayavi 
 Nadeeladiya 
 Niwataya
 Palingu Menike
 Raja Bhavana
 Raththarana Neth
 Sathyangana 
 Sayaweni Patumaga 
 Shoba 
 Suddilage Kathawa 
 Suwanda Yahaluwo
 Sura Pura Sara

Filmography
 No. denotes the Number of Sri Lankan films in the Sri Lankan cinema.

References

External links
Sri Lanka Sinhala Films Database - Sunil Hettiarachchi
 

Sri Lankan male film actors
Sinhalese male actors 
2015 deaths
1937 births